The Cooper Union for the Advancement of Science and Art (Cooper Union) is a private college at Cooper Square in New York City. Peter Cooper founded the institution in 1859 after learning about the government-supported École Polytechnique in France. The school was built on a radical new model of American higher education based on Cooper's belief that an education "equal to the best technology schools established" should be accessible to those who qualify, independent of their race, religion, sex, wealth or social status, and should be "open and free to all." Cooper is considered to be one of the most prestigious colleges in the United States, with all three of its member schools consistently ranked among the highest in the country.

The Cooper Union originally offered free courses to its admitted students, and when a four-year undergraduate program was established in 1902, the school granted each admitted student a full-tuition scholarship. Following its own financial crisis, the school decided to abandon this policy starting in the fall of 2014 with each incoming student receiving at least a half-tuition merit scholarship, with additional school financial support. The school plans to gradually reinstate full-tuition scholarships for undergraduates by the 2028–2029 academic year.

The college is divided into three schools: the Irwin S. Chanin School of Architecture, the School of Art, and the Albert Nerken School of Engineering. It offers undergraduate and master's degree programs exclusively in the fields of architecture, fine arts (undergraduate only), and engineering. It is a member of the Accreditation Board for Engineering and Technology (ABET) and the Association of Independent Colleges of Art and Design (AICAD). 

Cooper Union was one of very few American institutions of higher learning to offer a full-tuition scholarship – valued at approximately $150,000 as of 2012 – to every admitted student. Cooper Union has historically been one of the most selective colleges in the United States, with an acceptance rate typically below 10 percent. Both the art and architecture schools have acceptance rates below 5 percent. Cooper Union experienced a 20 percent increase in applications for the 2008–2009 academic year, further lowering the acceptance rate. The school also experienced a 70 percent increase in early decision applications for the 2009–2010 academic year. As a result of its record low acceptance ratio for the fall-2010 incoming class, Cooper Union was named by Newsweek as the "#1 Most Desirable Small School".

History

Founding and early history
The Cooper Union was founded in 1859 by American industrialist Peter Cooper, who was a prolific inventor, successful entrepreneur, and one of the richest businessmen in the United States.  Cooper was a workingman's son who had less than a year of formal schooling, and yet became an industrialist and inventor.  Cooper designed and built America's first steam railroad engine, and made a fortune with a glue factory and iron foundry.  After achieving wealth, he turned his entrepreneurial skills to successful ventures in real estate, insurance and railroads.  He was a principal investor and first president of the New York, Newfoundland and London Telegraph Company, which laid the first transatlantic telegraph cable, and once ran for President under the Greenback Party, becoming the oldest person ever nominated for the office.

Cooper's dream was to give talented young people the one privilege he lacked: a good education from an institution which was "open and free to all." He felt that this would make possible the development of talent that otherwise might have gone undiscovered.

To achieve these goals, Cooper designated the bulk of his wealth, primarily in the form of real estate holdings, to the creation and funding of The Cooper Union, a tuition-free school with courses made freely available to any applicant. According to The New York Times in 1863, "It was rare that those of limited means, however eager they might be to acquire a knowledge of some of the higher branches of education, could obtain tuition in studies not named in the regular course taught in our public schools. Since the opening of this institute, all who desire, and particularly those who work for their own support, can avail themselves, free of charge, of all the advantages the institution affords...those [students] only are supposed to pay anything who are abundantly able, or prefer to do so." Discrimination based on ethnicity, religion, or sex was expressly prohibited. People with limited funds could obtain tuition in studies and receive knowledge from branches of higher education where all were welcomed, free of charge, to the opportunities the institution grants.

Development after founding
Originally intended to be named simply "the Union", the Cooper Union began with adult education in night classes on the subjects of applied sciences and architectural drawing, as well as day classes primarily intended for women on the subjects of photography, telegraphy, typewriting and shorthand in what was called the college's Female School of Design. The early institution also had a free reading room open day and night, the first in New York City (predating the New York Public Library system, which did not become free until 1895), and a new four-year nighttime engineering college for men and a few women. In 1883, a five-year curriculum in chemistry was added as an alternative to the applied science (engineering) program. A daytime engineering college was added in 1902, thanks to funds contributed by Andrew Carnegie. Initial board members included Daniel F. Tiemann, John E. Parsons, Horace Greeley and William Cullen Bryant, and those who availed themselves of the institute's courses in its early days included Augustus Saint-Gaudens, Thomas Alva Edison and William Francis Deegan.

The Cooper Union's free classes – a landmark in American history and the prototype for what is now called continuing education – have evolved into three schools: the School of Art, the Irwin S. Chanin School of Architecture, and the Albert Nerken School of Engineering.  Peter Cooper's dream of providing an education "equal to the best" has since become reality.  Since 1859, the Cooper Union has educated thousands of artists, architects, and engineers, many of them leaders in their fields.

After 1864 there were a few attempts to merge Cooper Union and Columbia University, but these were never realized.

The Cooper Hewitt, Smithsonian Design Museum, was founded in 1897 as part of Cooper Union by Sarah, Eleanor, and Amy Hewitt, granddaughters of Peter Cooper.

Structure-building era

The Foundation Building
Cooper Union's Foundation Building is an Italianate brownstone building designed by architect Fred A. Petersen, one of the founders of the American Institute of Architects. It was the first structure in New York City to feature rolled-iron I-beams for structural support; Peter Cooper himself invented and produced these beams. Petersen patented a fire-resistant hollow brick tile he used in the building's construction.  The building was the first in the world to be built with an elevator shaft, because Cooper, in 1853, was confident an elevator would soon be invented. However, Cooper expected elevator carriages to be cylindrical, so he designed and built the shaft in the shape of a circle.  The building was declared a National Historic Landmark in 1961, and a New York City Landmark in 1965, and added to the Historic American Engineering Record in 1971.

The Foundation Building's Great Hall

On February 27, 1860, the school's Great Hall, located in the basement level of the Foundation Building, became the site of a historic address by Abraham Lincoln.

"Lincoln made his address on a snowy night before about 1,500 persons."

Abraham Lincoln's speech opposed Stephen A. Douglas on the question of federal power to regulate and limit the spread of slavery to the federal territories and new States. Lincoln differentiated his claims from those of the Democrats, who accused Republicans of being a sectional party or of helping John Brown's raid on Harpers Ferry or who threatened secession if Lincoln were elected.

Widely reported in the press and reprinted throughout the North in pamphlet form, the speech galvanized support for Lincoln and contributed to his gaining the Party's nomination for the Presidency. It is now referred to as the Cooper Union Address.

Since then, the Great Hall has served as a platform for historic addresses by American Presidents Grant, Cleveland, Taft, Theodore Roosevelt, Woodrow Wilson, and Bill Clinton. Clinton spoke on May 12, 1993, about reducing the federal deficit and again on May 23, 2006, as the Keynote Speaker at The Cooper Union's 147th Commencement along with Anna Deavere Smith. He appeared a third time on April 23, 2007, along with Senator Edward Kennedy, Henry Kissinger, Norman Mailer, and others, at the memorial service for historian Arthur M. Schlesinger Jr. Most recently, Barack Obama delivered an economic policy speech at Cooper Union's Great Hall on April 22, 2010. On September 22, 2014, President of the Palestinian National Authority Mahmoud Abbas delivered his first formal speech in English, sponsored by Churches for Middle East Peace, calling for peace with Israel that would include a new timetable for a two-state solution.

In addition to addresses by political figures, the Great Hall hosts semi-annual meetings of the New York City Rent Control Board, as well as incidental organized protests and recreational events. It is the stage for Cooper Union's commencement ceremony as well as the annual student orientation meeting for incoming freshman students. Cooper Union's Great Hall was also the site of the school's inauguration, whose primary address was given by the school's founder Peter Cooper on November 2, 1859. Other speakers in the Great Hall have included Fredrick Douglass, Susan B. Anthony, Elizabeth Cady Stanton, Mark Twain, and others.
The Great Hall also continues to serve as an important metropolitan art space and has hosted lectures and performances by such key figures as Joseph Campbell, Steve Reich, Salman Rushdie, Ralph Nader, Hamza Yusuf, Richard Stallman, Rudolph Giuliani, Pema Chodron, Michael Bloomberg, Evo Morales, and Venezuelan president Hugo Chávez. When not occupied by external or hosted events, the Great Hall is made accessible to students and faculty for large lectures and recreational activities, including the school's annual Culture Show. The Hall's audio/visual resources are operated by a student staff under faculty management, as part of Cooper Union's extensive work-study employment program, though some high-profile hosted events are operated by professional staff. In 1994, the Cooper Union Forum of Public Programs was honored with a Village Award from the Greenwich Village Society for Historic Preservation. 

In late 2008, the Great Hall was closed to students and outside events for the first major renovation of the hall since 1978. This renovation and redecoration was overseen by Sam Anderson Architects, a firm created and led by Cooper Union School of Architecture alumni, while the Arup Acoustics company was responsible for analysis and renovation of the hall's acoustic profile, which included installation of modern sound diffusion paneling on the rear walls. The audience seats, which had not been altered since a prior renovation in 1906, were replaced by modern seating designed to replicate the unique shape of the original furniture. In addition, the audio/visual and lighting systems of the Great Hall were updated to modern standards, including installation of ceiling-mounted digital projectors and intelligent lighting fixtures, to meet the increasing demands of hosted and student events. The hallway and lobby leading to the Great Hall were also redecorated during the renovation period, with additions featuring historical information and primary source documents relevant to the space. In 2015, the Great Hall hosted a musical tribute devoted to the men, women and children affected by the American Civil War over 150 years before.

Modern changes
The Cooper Union evolved over time into its current form, featuring schools in architecture, fine art, and engineering. At present, these three fields represent Cooper Union's degree programs (exclusively). The Faculty of Humanities and Social Studies provides classes and faculty to all three programs.

Modern curricular changes include the consolidation of the School of Engineering's interdisciplinary engineering (IDE) major and BSE program, after faculty reviews of the two programs yielded votes of no confidence and concerns of limited support.

In September 1992, Cooper Union opened its Student Residence Hall, located across 3rd Avenue from the Foundation Building, as the school's first-ever on-campus housing resource. This apartment-style dormitory provides living space for 178 students, or approximately one-fifth of the school's student population. In addition to resident assistants, the Residence Hall provides living spaces for incoming freshman students of all three schools. New first-year students are not required to live in the dormitory building, unlike housing policies of many other universities. Remaining space in the building, when available, is allocated to upper-class students based on individual housing needs.

In 2002, the school decided to generate additional needed revenue by razing its engineering building and having it replaced with a commercial building, and also replacing its Hewitt Building with a New Academic Building. In response to concerns by East Village residents and local elected officials that the development might convert their artistic neighborhood into a sterile business campus, Cooper Union altered the building designs and sizes that were then approved by city planners.

In 2016, in response to two years of pressure from the student body, Cooper Union "de-gendered" its bathrooms, removing all "Men" and "Women" signs and making them all gender-neutral.

41 Cooper Square

A new classroom, laboratory, and studio facility designed by Thom Mayne of Morphosis Architecture with associate architect Gruzen Samton completed construction in Summer 2009, replacing the aging Hewitt Academic Building at 41 Cooper Square. In contrast to the Foundation Building, 41 Cooper Square is of modern, environmentally "green" design, housing nine above-ground floors and two basements. The structure features unconventional architectural features, including a full-height Grand Atrium, prevalent interior windows, a four-story linear central staircase, and upper-level skyways, which reflect the design intention of inspiring, socially interactive space for students and faculty. In addition, the building's design allows for up to 75% natural lighting, further reducing energy costs. Other "green" features in the design include servo-controlled external wall panels, which can be swiveled open or closed individually in order to regulate interior light and temperature, as well as motorized drapes on all exterior windows. In 2010, 41 Cooper Square became the first academic and laboratory structure in New York City to meet Platinum-level LEED standards for energy efficiency. The building was funded in part by alumni donations, materialized in nameplates and other textual recognition throughout the building.

Primarily designed to house the Cooper Union's School of Engineering and School of Art, the new building's first eight above-ground floors are populated by classrooms, small engineering laboratories, study lounges, art studio space, and faculty offices. The ninth, top floor is dedicated completely to School of Art studio and classroom space in addition to the art studio spaces located throughout the building. The lowest basement level consists almost completely of the school's large machine shops and design laboratories, as well as much of the HVAC and supply infrastructure. The building's first basement level houses primarily the Frederick P. Rose Auditorium, a 198-capacity lecture hall and event space designed as a smaller, more modern alternative to the Great Hall. In addition, the first basement's Menschel Conference Room provides a high-profile space for meetings and classes, and features a high-definition videoconferencing system linked to two other similar spaces in the upper floors of the building.

Connecting the first four floors of 41 Cooper Square is the linear Grand Staircase, which is used both for transportation and as a recreational space for students. Higher floors are connected by floating interior skyways, in addition to two standard corner staircases and three passenger elevators. At the peak of the Grand Staircase is the Ware & Drucker Student Lounge, which houses a small cafeteria service for students as well as a relaxed, naturally lit study location.

Financial support

A substantial portion of the annual budget, which supports the full-tuition scholarships in addition to the school's costs, is generated through revenues from real estate. In addition, the value of its real estate is a very important asset to the college, and has increased its endowment to over $600 million. The land under the Chrysler Building is owned by the endowment, and as of 2009, Cooper Union received $7 million per year from this parcel. Further, under a very unusual arrangement, New York City real-estate taxes assessed against the Chrysler lease, held by Aby Rosen, are paid to Cooper Union, not the city. This arrangement would be voided if Cooper Union sold the real estate. In 2006, Tishman Speyer signed a deal with the school to pay rent that has escalated to $32.5 million in 2018, and will increase to $41 million in 2028 and $55 million in 2038. During the national real estate crash in 2009, Cooper Union investment committee Chair John Michaelson acknowledged to The Wall Street Journal that Tishman Speyer "would not do that deal today" since such a generous deal had been made near the peak of the real estate boom.

Financial crisis and tuition controversy

Around October 29, 2011, rumors circulated the school was in serious financial trouble. On October 31, a series of open forums were held with students, faculty, and alumni to address the crisis.

Current and past students voiced opposition on social networking sites and in print publications to the plan to begin charging tuition. The then-president of the school, Jamshed Bharucha, indicated depletion of the school's endowment required additional sources of funding. A possible tuition levy and more pointed solicitation of alumni donations and research grants were being considered to offset recent financial practices such as liquidating assets and spending heavily on 41 Cooper Square, a controversial new academic building. On April 24, 2012, the college announced approval from its board of trustees to attempt to establish a new tuition-based cross-disciplinary graduate program, expand its fee-based continuing education programs, and impose tuition on some students in its existing graduate programs, effective September 2013.

In December 2012, as a protest against the possibility of undergraduate tuition being charged, 11 students occupied a suite in the Foundation Building for a week. Solicitation of additional endowment to support the free tuition policy was complicated by the school's policy of granting full tuition scholarships to wealthy students. Charging high tuition was complicated by the school's lack of customary amenities offered by other high-tuition schools.

On April 23, 2013, The New York Times reported the college had announced it would end its free tuition policy for undergraduates, beginning in fall 2014. The administration maintained that they would continue to offer need-based tuition remission to incoming undergraduates on a sliding scale. On May 8, 2013, a group of students occupied President Bharucha's office in protest over the end of free tuition. The administration, board of trustees, and those members of the Cooper Union community who had been occupying the Office of the President since early May reached an agreement that ended the occupation on July 12.

Throughout 2013, 2014, and 2015, the Committee to Save Cooper Union (CSCU) — a coalition of former and current students, alumni and faculty — campaigned to reverse this decision, urging the president and the board of trustees to return Cooper Union to “its tuition-free and merit-based mission, ensure the school’s fiscal recovery, and establish better governance structures.”

On September 1, 2015, the school and the CSCU announced the CSCU's lawsuit against the school's administration was resolved in the form of a consent decree signed by Cooper Union, then-New York State's Attorney General Eric Schneiderman, and the CSCU. The decree includes provisions for returning to a sustainable, tuition-free policy, increased board transparency, additional student, faculty and alumni trustees, an independent financial monitor appointed by the Attorney General, and a search committee to identify the next full-term president.

On January 15, 2018, the Free Education Committee (FEC) of the school's Board of Trustees released their recommended plan to return to full-tuition scholarships for undergraduates only by the academic year starting in the fall of 2028. In March 2018, the Board released its approved, updated version with the same milestone.

Academics

The Albert Nerken School of Engineering
The Cooper Union's School of Engineering is named in honor of Albert Nerken, a chemical engineering alumnus of the school. Its enrollment includes about 550 students, and is the largest of the three schools by a significant margin. It is one of the most prestigious and selective engineering schools in the United States, consistently ranked within the top ten undergraduate engineering programs among non-doctorate-awarding schools nationwide. The school offers ABET-accredited Bachelor of Engineering (BE) degree programs in core engineering fields and an interdisciplinary Bachelor of Science in Engineering (BSE) degree. Opportunities are also available for engineering students to pursue minors in bioengineering, chemistry, computer science, humanities and social sciences, and mathematics.

Specialized facilities for teaching and research include the Maurice Kanbar Center for Biomedical Engineering established in 2002 and the interdisciplinary Maker Space Lab, established in 2020 for the use of engineering, art, and architecture students.

Master's in Engineering
The School of Engineering offers master's degrees in chemical, civil, electrical, or mechanical engineering. Although all departments offer a thesis option, in some cases students may pursue a master's degree solely through coursework and projects. A "4 +" dual degree option is also available whereby Cooper Union undergraduate engineering students may earn a bachelor's degree and a master's degree in as little as 5 years.

The School of Art

Consisting of roughly 200 students and 70 faculty members, the Cooper Union School of Art offers a Bachelor of Fine Arts (BFA) degree and a Certificate of Fine Arts. As a member school of AICAD, School of Art students may participate in exchange programs with the other colleges in the association, including California Institute of the Arts and Otis College of Art and Design.

The Cooper Union Art program is often referred to as "generalist" or "versatile" when compared to other Fine Arts colleges; incoming students do not choose an academic major within the Fine Arts field, but instead are permitted and encouraged to select courses from any of the School of Art's departments. This approach allows for a personalized curriculum which addresses each student's particular interests, regardless of variation or eclecticism. In addition, the program and curriculum place heavy emphasis on each student's creative and imaginative abilities, rather than technical precision in a specific medium, to develop the social awareness and critical analysis skills relevant to art in the contemporary world.

Galleries
Located in both public spaces and specialized rooms, Cooper Union's galleries provide space for installations and showcases by students, faculty, and guest artists. Popular gallery locations include the Great Hall lobby in the Foundation Building and newly opened 41 Cooper Gallery in 41 Cooper Square, which provides a two-story high space for large, three-dimensional exhibitions and works visible from both the building lobby and 7th street through large plate-glass windows.

In addition, numerous smaller exhibition spaces exist throughout both buildings on campus, providing space for student projects and individual artwork to be displayed. Larger spaces on the upper floors of the Foundation Building are used primarily for interdisciplinary exhibitions with the School of Architecture. For presentations of video and digital media, the Great Hall and 41 Cooper Square's Rose Auditorium are used. Exhibition resources including frames, stands, projectors, and mounting hardware are provided to students and faculty by the school's Buildings and Grounds department.

Irwin S. Chanin School of Architecture
The Irwin S. Chanin School of Architecture at the Cooper Union offers a five-year NAAB accredited program established by John Hejduk. The school ranks among the top five architecture programs in the United States. The philosophical foundation of the school was directly committed to the "Social Contract" and dedicated to education as "one of the last places that protects freedom, and teaching as a sociopolitical act, among other things." among those other things were principles of free debate and theoretical discourse which drew source from deep wellsprings of lost histories such as the Bauhaus school of Architecture founded by Ludwig Mies van der Rohe.

The current five-year Design sequence (2016) is structured by elements of architectural practice to varying degrees of claim: investigation of program, construction methods i.e. structure, and square footage. Classroom facilities include a lecture room (315), seminar classrooms, and ample facade and flat surface space for presentation. There is also a computer and fabrication lab available for student productions on the seventh floor.

The faculty includes influential practicing architects, design and construction managers such as Peter Eisenman, Samuel Anderson, Elizabeth O'Donnell, Nader Tehrani, and Diana Agrest.  Former faculty members include notable architects such as Michael Webb, Peter Eisenman, Raimund Abraham, Lebbeus Woods, Diane Lewis and John Hejduk.

Master of Architecture II
The post-professional degree program in architecture was launched in 2009. Concentrations in one or a combination of three areas are offered: theory, history and criticism of architecture, urban studies and technologies.

Faculty of Humanities and Social Sciences
The Faculty of Humanities and Social Sciences provides the academic thread that binds the three schools into a tightly integrated whole. The Cooper Union is committed to the principle that an education in the liberal arts provides the ethical, social and humanistic framework crucial to personal development and professional excellence; thus, all students in the first two years take a core curriculum of required courses in the humanities and social sciences. These courses are not segregated by member school or academic major, and provide a formal opportunity for students in each of the three Schools to interact in an interdisciplinary environment. Students in the School of Art take an additional three-semester sequence in art history. During the third and fourth years, students have considerable latitude to explore the humanities and social sciences through elective courses. The Center for Writing works with all students throughout their time at The Cooper Union, providing both tutoring for Humanities courses and assistance with other writing-related tasks (such as technical documentation of research projects and the production of résumés.)

Athletics
Cooper Union has developed an athletic program which fields teams in basketball, volleyball, and soccer.

Notable alumni

Awards received by Cooper Union alumni include one Nobel Prize in Physics, a Pritzker Prize, fifteen Rome Prizes, 26 Guggenheim Fellowships, three MacArthur Fellowships, nine Chrysler Design Awards, three Emmy Awards, one Tony, one Grammy, one Queen Elizabeth Prize for Engineering, and three Thomas Jefferson Awards for Public Architecture, which is sponsored by the American Institute of Architects. The school also boasts 39 Fulbright Scholars since 2001, and thirteen National Science Foundation Graduate Research Fellowships since 2004.

Notable faculty

Notable faculty of the Cooper Union include:
 Raimund Abraham, architect
 Diana Agrest, architect 
 William Arnold Anthony, physicist
 George Herman Babcock, inventor
 Eleanor K. Baum, electrical engineer
 Mary Blade, mechanical engineer 
 John Christopher Draper, chemist and surgeon
 Thomas Eakins, painter
 Peter Eisenman, architect 
 William Germano, editor
 Charles Gwathmey, architect 
 Hans Haacke, artist
 Jonas Mekas, filmmaker
 Margaret Morton, photographer and artist
 Aldo Rossi, architect
 Ricardo Scofidio, architect 
 Ysrael Seinuk, structural engineer
 David Shapiro, poet
 Nina Tandon, biomedical engineer
 William Wiswesser, chemist; inventor of Wiswesser line notation
 Lebbeus Woods, architect 
 John Celivergos Zachos, physician, inventor and literary scholar

In popular culture
Film

 In Susan Skoog's coming-of-age independent film Whatever (1998), precocious suburban teen Anna Stockard (Liza Weil) harbors dreams of moving to the city to study art at the Cooper Union in the early 80s.
 The Cooper Union and its student dorms were featured as background in The Interpreter (2005).
 The Disappearance of Eleanor Rigby features the New Academic Building.
 Winter's Tale (2014) was filmed at Cooper's foundation building to fit the novel's early 1900 setting.

Literature
 The Cooper Union acts as a symbol of Progressivism in the Pulitzer Prize-winning novel His Family (1917) by Ernest Poole, as well as in the novel From Immigrant to Inventor (1924) by Michael Pupin.
 Cooper Union is the meeting place of two main characters in The Gilded Hour (2015), a historical novel by Sara Donati. The characters first encounter one another at Abraham Lincoln's 1860 speech at Cooper Union.

Television
The "New Academic Building" designed by Thom Mayne was frequently shown in episodes of the television series Instinct, wherein it was depicted as the NYC 11th police precinct in which its main characters were based.

See also

 Presidents of Cooper Union
 Association of Independent Technological Universities

References

External links

Information about Cooper Union and the Foundation Building from The Cooper Union Library and Archives
New York Architecture Images – the Cooper Union Foundation Building
Original 1861 Harper's Weekly Story on the Cooper Union

 
1859 establishments in New York (state)
Architecture schools in New York City
Art museums and galleries in Manhattan
Art schools in New York City
East Village, Manhattan
Educational institutions established in 1859
Graphic design schools in the United States
Historic American Engineering Record in New York City
National Historic Landmarks in Manhattan
New York City Designated Landmarks in Manhattan
Peter Cooper
Private universities and colleges in New York City
School buildings on the National Register of Historic Places in Manhattan
Technological universities in the United States
Universities and colleges in Manhattan
Universities and colleges in New York City
University art museums and galleries in New York City
Astor Place